The 2018 China Open was held from October 16 to 22 in Chongqing, China. It was the second edition of the event which was first held in 2013. The winning team on both sides received $50,000 of the total $200,000 (US).

In both the men's and women's events, the Russian teams came out victorious. In the men's final, Sergey Glukhov won 9–8 over Canada's Brad Gushue while in the women's, Alina Kovaleva won 6–4 over Switzerland's Ursi Hegner, both in extra ends.

Through the round robin stage, both the Gushue and Glukhov rinks posted 6–1 records, however, the Canadian team received first place due to their head-to-head victory over the Russian team. Sweden's Fredrik Nyman as well as Norway's Thomas Ulsrud both also qualified for the playoff stage with 5–2 records each. In the semifinals, Team Gushue won 5–2 over the Nyman rink who they had previously lost to in the round robin. Russia's Glukhov also got one in the eighth end to knock off Norway's Ulsrud 4–3 in the other semifinal. In the high scoring final, the Russian side stole a single in the seventh end before the Canadian team got two in the eighth to tie the game. In the extra, Sergey Glukhov counted one to ensure the victory for his team. The lineup also includes Artur Ali, Dmitry Mironov and Anton Kalalb. Norway's Ulsrud rink won the bronze medal game by defeating the Nyman rink 8–2. The men's field was rounded out by teams from South Korea, Switzerland, China and the United States.

The women's division was not the same narrative, with the Russian women's team of Alina Kovaleva, Anastasia Bryzgalova, Uliana Vasilyeva, Ekaterina Kuzmina and Galina Arsenkina going 7–0 through the round robin. The three other qualifiers all had 4–3 records, Switzerland's Hegner, Canada's Jennifer Jones and China's Mei Jie. The Russian rink continued their dominance in the semifinal with a 5–3 win over the Chinese Mei team, while Hegner bounced Canada's Team Jones by a score of 8–3. In the final, Team Hegner were forced to a single in the eighth end to send a game to an extra end. It was there where the Russian team sealed the victory and the second annual China Open cup. Canada's Jones took home the third place title with a triumphant 10–3 final over China's Mei. Denmark, Scotland, Germany and the United States rounded out the women's field of the 2018 event.

Men

Teams

The teams are listed as follows:

Round-robin standings
Final round-robin standings

Round-robin results 
All draw times are listed in China Standard Time (UTC+08:00).

Draw 1
Tuesday, October 16, 9:00 am

Draw 2
Tuesday, October 16, 5:00 pm

Draw 3
Wednesday, October 17, 1:00 pm

Draw 4
Thursday, October 18, 9:00 am

Draw 5
Thursday, October 18, 5:00 pm

Draw 6
Friday, October 19, 1:00 pm

Draw 7
Saturday, October 20, 9:00 am

Playoffs

Source:

Semifinals
Sunday, October 21, 1:00 pm

Bronze medal game
Monday, October 22, 9:00 am

Final
Monday, October 22, 9:00 am

Women

Teams

The teams are listed as follows:

Round-robin standings
Final round-robin standings

Round-robin results 
All draw times are listed in China Standard Time (UTC+08:00).

Draw 1
Tuesday, October 16, 1:00 pm

Draw 2
Wednesday, October 17, 9:00 am

Draw 3
Wednesday, October 17, 5:00 pm

Draw 4
Thursday, October 18, 1:00 pm

Draw 5
Friday, October 19, 9:00 am

Draw 6
Friday, October 19, 5:00 pm

Draw 7
Saturday, October 20, 1:00 pm

Playoffs

Source:

Semifinals
Sunday, October 21, 5:00 pm

Bronze medal game
Monday, October 22, 1:00 pm

Final
Monday, October 22, 1:00 pm

References

External links
Men's Event
Women's Event

2018 in curling
October 2018 sports events in China
International curling competitions hosted by China
Sport in Beijing